Petr Korbel (born 6 June 1971 in Havířov, Czechoslovakia) is a Czech table tennis player who has competed in five Olympics from 1992 to 2008. His best performance was in 1996 when he came fourth in the singles, losing to Germany's Jörg Roßkopf in the bronze medal match.

Petr Korbel is the most successful among the current Czech table tennis players. He has been one of the top European and world players for more than 10 years. Korbel's best position in the ITTF world rankings was 16th place in 2001. He is currently ranked 119th (October 2012).

In terms of playing style, Petr Korbel can be described as an offensive, technical two-wing looper. Another weapon of his is short game. Korbel is a right-handed shakehand player with an excellent use of the wrist when playing backhand loops. His spectacular backhand topspin with a strong sidespin, called "chiquita" after the curve of the ball, is well known among his competitors. Korbel uses this stroke to attack even very short and low serves, and this surprising stroke often brings points.

Korbel is a Butterfly contract player and co-operated on the development of a table tennis blade which has been produced under his name.

Big events appearance 
 15x European Championships 
 14x World Championships
 5x Olympic Games

Career records 
 1988 – European Junior Champion
 1991 – World Championships: 3rd in the team competition
 1996 – Olympic Games: 4th place
 2000 – 3rd position European Championship Single
 2003, 2005, 2010 – European Championships: 3rd in the team competition
 4-time winner of the Prague Open table tennis tournament

See also
 List of athletes with the most appearances at Olympic Games

External links
 Sports-Reference Profile

1971 births
Living people
Czech male table tennis players
Olympic table tennis players of Czechoslovakia
Olympic table tennis players of the Czech Republic
Table tennis players at the 1992 Summer Olympics
Table tennis players at the 1996 Summer Olympics
Table tennis players at the 2000 Summer Olympics
Table tennis players at the 2004 Summer Olympics
Table tennis players at the 2008 Summer Olympics
People from Havířov
Sportspeople from the Moravian-Silesian Region